Sipadan is the only oceanic island in Malaysia, rising  from the seabed. It is located in the Celebes Sea off the east coast of Sabah, Malaysia. It was formed by living corals growing on top of an extinct volcanic cone that took thousands of years to develop. Sipadan is located at the heart of the Indo-Pacific basin, the centre of one of the richest marine habitats in the world. More than 400 species of fish and hundreds of coral species have been classified in this ecosystem. Sipadan Island was at the top of Rodale's Scuba Diving Magazine Gold List for 'The Top Dive Destination in the World'. In fact it shared its top spot with 2 other destinations known for the diversity of their marine life — the Galápagos Islands of Ecuador and Truk in Micronesia. Further more, one of the dive operators; Scuba Junkie was voted by the public the "Best Dive Resort in the World 2020" at DiveMagazine's annual Dive Travel Awards.

Frequently seen in the waters around Sipadan: green and hawksbill turtles (which mate and nest there), enormous schools of barracuda in tornado-like formations as well as large schools of big-eye trevally, and bumphead parrotfish. Pelagic species such as manta rays, eagle rays, scalloped hammerhead sharks and whale sharks also visit Sipadan. A turtle tomb lies underneath the column of the island, formed by an underwater limestone cave with a labyrinth of tunnels and chambers that contain many skeletal remains of turtles that become lost and drown before finding the surface. Visiting Sipadan Island requires a permit issued by Sabah Parks, a Sabah Government agency. Since 2019, there are 178 permits available each day. Sipadan Island will be closed from 1 November until 30 November 2020 for 'Marine Life Recuperation'. It will open again to tourism operations from 1 December 2020.

History 

In the past, the island was at the centre of a territorial dispute between Malaysia and Indonesia. The matter was brought for adjudication before the International Court of Justice and, at the end of 2002, the Court awarded the island along with the island of Ligitan to Malaysia, on the basis of the "effective occupation" displayed by the latter's predecessor (Malaysia's former colonial power, the United Kingdom) and the absence of any other superior title. The Philippines had applied to intervene in the proceedings on the basis of their claim to Northern Borneo, but their request was turned down by the Court early in 2001.

The island was declared a bird sanctuary in 1933 by the colonial government of North Borneo and re-gazetted in 1963 by the Malaysian government. In the film Borneo: The Ghost of the Sea Turtle (1989) Jacques Cousteau said: "I have seen other places like Sipadan, 45 years ago, but now no more. Now we have found an untouched piece of art".

Filipino militant attacks 

On 23 April 2000, 21 people were kidnapped by the Filipino Moro pirate group Abu Sayyaf. The armed terrorists arrived by boat, forcing 10 tourists and 11 resort workers to board the vessels at gunpoint, after which they brought the victims to Jolo. All of the victims were eventually released. As a result of the attacks, the island management together with Ligitan was put under the Malaysian National Security Council (NSC).

On 8 July 2019, Prime Minister Mahathir Mohamad has agreed in principle to return the management of both islands from the NSC back to the Sabah government under Sabah Tourism, Culture and Environment Ministry with the takeover will be done once the federal Cabinet approving the request.

Gallery

See also 
 Mabul Island

References

External links 

 Tourism Malaysia – Sipadan Island

Islands of Sabah
Underwater diving sites in Malaysia
Tourism in Sabah
Indonesia–Malaysia border
Former disputed islands
Islands of Malaysia